Lives of the Monster Dogs (1997) is a novel by Kirsten Bakis first published by Farrar, Straus & Giroux. It was named a New York Times Notable Book of the year in 1997, and one of the Best Books of the Year by the Village Voice. It was shortlisted for the Orange Prize for Fiction, and won the Bram Stoker Award for Best First Novel. It has been translated into eight languages and made into a stage play.

Plot summary
A group of elegant monster dogs in top hats, tails, and bustle skirts become instant celebrities when they come to New York in 2008. Refugees from a town whose residents had been utterly isolated for a hundred years, the dogs retain the nineteenth-century Germanic culture of the humans who created them. They are wealthy and glamorous and seem to lead charmed lives – but they find adjusting to the modern world difficult, and when a young woman, Cleo Pira, befriends them, she discovers that a strange, incurable illness threatens them all with extinction. When the dogs construct their dream home, a fantastic castle on the Lower East Side, and barricade themselves inside, Cleo finds herself one of the few human witnesses to a mad, lavish party that may prove to be the final act in the drama of the lives of the monster dogs.

Reviews
The New York Times called it "haunting, fiercely original . . . a dazzling, unforgettable meditation on what it means to be human."

Film

In 2010 it was reported that the book had been optioned for possible development as a movie.

Footnotes

1997 American novels
Novels set in New York City
Lower East Side
Farrar, Straus and Giroux books
Fiction set in 2008